KSLI may refer to:

 King's Shropshire Light Infantry
 The ICAO code for Los Alamitos Army Airfield
 KSLI (AM), an AM radio station licensed to Abilene, Texas, United States